Margevičius (or Margevicius) is a surname. Notable people with the surname include:

Deividas Margevičius (born 1995), Lithuanian swimmer 
Nick Margevicius (born 1996), American baseball player
Vincė Vaidevutė Margevičienė (born 1949),Lithuanian biologist, political prisoner, politician, and a former Member of the Seimas

See also
Markevičius, a similar surname